Google Neural Machine Translation (GNMT) is a neural machine translation (NMT) system developed by Google and introduced in November 2016, that uses an artificial neural network to increase fluency and accuracy in Google Translate.

GNMT improves on the quality of translation by applying an example-based (EBMT) machine translation method in which the system "learns from millions of examples". GNMT's proposed architecture of system learning was first tested on over a hundred languages supported by Google Translate. With the large end-to-end framework, the system learns over time to create better, more natural translations. GNMT attempts to translate whole sentences at a time, rather than just piece by piece. The GNMT network can undertake interlingual machine translation by encoding the semantics of the sentence, rather than by memorizing phrase-to-phrase translations.

History 
The Google Brain project was established in 2011 in the "secretive Google X research lab" by Google Fellow Jeff Dean, Google Researcher Greg Corrado, and Stanford University Computer Science professor Andrew Ng. Ng's work has led to some of the biggest breakthroughs at Google and Stanford.

In November 2016, Google Neural Machine Translation system (GNMT) was introduced. Since then, Google Translate began using neural machine translation (NMT) in preference to its previous statistical methods (SMT) which had been used since October 2007, with its proprietary, in-house SMT technology.

Google Translate's NMT system uses a large artificial neural network capable of deep learning. By using millions of examples, GNMT improves the quality of translation, using broader context to deduce the most relevant translation. The result is then rearranged and adapted to approach grammatically based human language. GNMT's proposed architecture of system learning was first tested on over a hundred languages supported by Google Translate. GNMT did not create its own universal interlingua but rather aimed at finding the commonality between many languages using insights from psychology and linguistics. The new translation engine was first enabled for eight languages: to and from English and French, German, Spanish, Portuguese, Chinese, Japanese, Korean and Turkish in November 2016. In March 2017, three additional languages were enabled: Russian, Hindi and Vietnamese along with Thai for which support was added later. Support for Hebrew and Arabic was also added with help from the Google Translate Community in the same month. In mid April 2017 Google Netherlands announced support for Dutch and other European languages related to English. Further support was added for nine Indian languages: Hindi, Bengali, Marathi, Gujarati, Punjabi, Tamil, Telugu, Malayalam and Kannada at the end of April 2017.

Evaluation 
The GNMT system is said to represent an improvement over the former Google Translate in that it will be able to handle "zero-shot translation", that is it directly translates one language into another (for example, Japanese to Korean). Google Translate previously first translated the source language into English and then translated the English into the target language rather than translating directly from one language to another.

A July 2019 study in Annals of Internal Medicine found that "Google Translate is a viable, accurate tool for translating non–English-language trials". Only one disagreement between reviewers reading machine-translated trials was due to a translation error. Since many medical studies are excluded from systematic reviews because the reviewers do not understand the language, GNMT has the potential to reduce bias and improve accuracy in such reviews.

Languages supported by GNMT 
As of December 2021, all of the languages of Google Translate support GNMT, with Latin being the most recent addition.

Afrikaans
Albanian
Amharic
Arabic
Armenian
Azerbaijani
Basque
Belarusian
Bengali
Bosnian
Bulgarian
Burmese
Catalan
Cebuano
Chewa
Chinese (Simplified)
Chinese (Traditional)
Corsican
Croatian
Czech
Danish
Dutch
English
Esperanto
Estonian
Filipino (Tagalog)
Finnish
French
Galician
Georgian
German
Greek
Gujarati
Haitian Creole
Hausa
Hawaiian
Hebrew
Hindi
Hmong
Hungarian
Icelandic
Igbo
Indonesian
Irish
Italian
Japanese
Javanese
Kannada
Kazakh
Khmer
Kinyarwanda
Korean
Kurdish (Kurmanji)
Kyrgyz
Lao
Latin
Latvian
Lithuanian
Luxembourgish
Macedonian
Malagasy
Malay
Malayalam
Maltese
Maori
Marathi
Mongolian
Nepali
Norwegian (Bokmål)
Odia
Pashto
Persian
Polish
Portuguese
Punjabi (Gurmukhi)
Romanian
Russian
Samoan
Scottish Gaelic
Serbian
Shona
Sindhi
Sinhala
Slovak
Slovenian
Somali
Sotho
Spanish
Sundanese
Swahili
Swedish
Tajik
Tamil
Tatar
Telugu
Thai
Turkish
Turkmen
Ukrainian
Urdu
Uyghur
Uzbek
Vietnamese
Welsh
West Frisian
Xhosa
Yiddish
Yoruba
Zulu

See also 

Example-based machine translation 
Rule-based machine translation
Comparison of machine translation applications
Statistical machine translation
Artificial intelligence
Cache language model
Computational linguistics
Computer-assisted translation
History of machine translation
List of emerging technologies
List of research laboratories for machine translation
Neural machine translation
Machine translation
Universal translator

References

External links 

Google’s Neural Machine Translation System: Bridging the Gap between Human and Machine Translation
The Advantages and Disadvantages of Machine Translation
Statistical Machine Translation
International Association for Machine Translation (IAMT) 
Machine Translation Archive  by John Hutchins. An electronic repository (and bibliography) of articles, books and papers in the field of machine translation and computer-based translation technology
Machine translation (computer-based translation) – Publications by John Hutchins (includes PDFs of several books on machine translation)

Applications of artificial intelligence
Computational linguistics
Machine translation
Artificial neural networks
Tasks of natural language processing
Neural Machine Translation